Douglas Percival Cooper (1875-1950) was a British cinematographer. He is generally credited as D. P. Cooper.

He was the father of Wilkie Cooper, who also became a cinematographer.

Selected filmography
 The Indian Love Lyrics (1923)
 A Woman Redeemed (1927)
 The King's Highway (1927)
 The Guns of Loos (1928)
 A Royal Demand (1933)
 Toilers of the Sea (1936)
 Trunk Crime (1939)
 Inquest (1939)
 The Greed of William Hart (1948)

References

Bibliography
 Stephen Chibnall & Brian McFarlane. Quota Quickies. British Film Institute, 2007.

External links

1875 births
1950 deaths
British cinematographers
People from Wiltshire